Universo Treviso Basket (diminutive TvB), known for sponsorship reasons as NutriBullet Treviso, is an Italian professional basketball club based in Treviso, Veneto. Founded in 2012, it plays in the Italian basketball first division Lega Basket Serie A (LBA) since the 2019–20 season. Despite being a distinct club, Universo Treviso de facto inherited the fanbase of Pallacanestro Treviso, the historic club of the town.

History

2012–2014: Beginnings

Following the Benetton family's planned withdrawal from professional basketball that would occur in July 2012 and see Benetton Treviso without backing, the Universo Treviso consortium was launched in March 2012 with the goal to assure the club's continued presence as a professional outfit. Former players, led by Riccardo Pittis who served as the consortium's guarantor, were at the basis of the initiative.

After overcoming some economic struggles, thanks to the efforts of Pittis, Claudio Coldebella and Paolo Vazzoler (who was named president), the consortium managed to obtain enough funding to create a new club on 4 July 2012, thanks to five local businessmen and the sixty-seven firms involved in the consortium. The new company, managing the club, Treviso Basket s.r.l., was given Benetton Treviso's sporting rights for free, though the latter had earlier withdrawn from the first division Serie A in order to apply for the amateur leagues (as a youth club).
However, the Italian Basketball Federation (FIP), who decides which clubs are admitted into the national leagues, refused Treviso Basket's application to join the Serie A, a decision upheld by the Federal Court on 2 August 2012. The explanation by FIP's president Dino Meneghin was that admitting the newly created organisation would go against league rules and create an unsustainable legal precedent. Meneghin also bemoaned the lack of reaction since Benetton announced its withdrawal eighteen months beforehand and the fact that the two entities did not merge.

The club grown up slowly, winning the amateur Promozione (the seventh division) thanks to support from Benetton Treviso, which transferred them their Under 19 squad and personnel. Treviso Basket earned promotion to the Serie D by winning the 2012–13 championship playoffs.
At the end of the season, the team got a wild card for the National Division B, the fourth level of the Italian championship. Treviso ended the regular season at the 4th place in the group, but it was immediately eliminated in the first round against APU Udine.

2014–2018: Second league's powerhouse
After buying the sporting rights of B.N.B. Corato, Treviso moved to the Serie A2 Silver, the nominal third division, which was soon merged with the second division, Serie A2 Gold. The club also changed its name to "Universo Treviso Basket". Treviso arrived first in the Serie A2 Silver regular season, moving on to the joint Gold/Silver playoffs where they lost in the first round.

In the 2015–16 season, Treviso won the Eastern group of the Serie A2 championship, qualifying for the playoffs where it ousted Junior Casale and Ferentino, but it was eliminated in the semifinals by Fortitudo Bologna. In the 2016–17 season, led by coach Stefano Pillastrini, the team qualified for the playoffs as the front-runner in the Eastern group. The team eliminated Trapani in the first round, while in the quarterfinals it faced once again Fortitudo Bologna, being ousted 3–1. In the 2017–18 season, he ranked third in the Eastern group, qualifying for the fourth consecutive year to the second league's playoffs, where it eliminated Trapani 3–1 and Ferrara 3–0. However, it was ousted 3–0 in the semifinals by Pallacanestro Trieste.

2018–2022: Menetti era
In June 2018, the club hired a new coach, Massimiliano Menetti. Menetti built up a good team, signing important players like David Logan, Amedeo Tessitori and Dominez Burnett, and renewing good Italian players like Matteo Imbrò. At the end of the regular season, Treviso arrived second behind Fortitudo. However, on  17 June 2019, after beating Benfapp Capo d'Orlando in the finals, it achieved the promotion to the Lega Basket Serie A (LBA).

Arena
During the first two years of its existence, Treviso Basket played in the Centro Natatorio and PalaCicogna (in Ponzano Veneto) respectively.
In 2014 it moved into the PalaVerde (capacity: 5,144), the state of the art former home of Benetton Treviso.

Head coaches
 Goran Bjedov (2012–2014)
 Gennaro Di Carlo (2014)
 Stefano Pillastrini (2014–2018)
 Massimiliano Menetti (2018–present)

Players

Current roster

Honours
Serie A2 Silver (3rd tier) champions: 2015
Serie A2 Basket (2nd tier) champions: 2019

Sponsorship names
Throughout the years, due to sponsorship, the club has been known as:
De' Longhi Treviso (2012–2021)
Nutribullet Treviso (2021–present)

References

External links
Official website  Retrieved 12 August 2015
Lega Nazionale Pallacanestro profile  Retrieved 12 August 2015
Eurobasket.com profile Retrieved 12 August 2015

2012 establishments in Italy
Basketball teams established in 2012
Basketball teams in Italy
Basketball teams in Veneto
Sport in Treviso